The Little Tales of Smethers and Other Stories is a collection of fantasy and crime short stories by writer Lord Dunsany. It was first published in London by Jarrolds in October, 1952.

The book collects twenty-six short pieces by Dunsany, including the much-anthologised mystery story "The Two Bottles of Relish", with its neat and devastating one-sentence solution at the end.

An audiobook of the collection was released in 2017.

Contents
 "The Two Bottles of Relish"
 "The Shooting of Constable Slugger"
 "An Enemy of Scotland Yard"
 "The Second Front"
 "The Two Assassins"
 "Kriegblut's Disguise"
 "The Mug in the Gambling Hall"
 "The Clue"
 "Once Too Often"
 "An Alleged Murder"
 "The Waiter's Story"
 "A Trade Dispute"
 "The Pirate of the Round Pond"
 "A Victim of Bad Luck"
 "The New Master"
 "A New Murder"
 "A Tale of Revenge"
 "The Speech"
 "The Lost Scientist"
 "The Unwritten Thriller"
 "In Ravancore"
 "Among the Bean Rows"
 "The Death-Watch Beetle"
 "Murder by Lightning"
 "The Murder in Netherby Gardens"
 "The Shield of Athene"

References

1952 short story collections
Fantasy short story collections
Crime short story collections
Short story collections by Edward Plunkett, 18th Baron of Dunsany
Jarrold Publishing books